Walting is a village in Kavrepalanchok District in Bagmati Province of central Nepal. It is located in the Roshi Rural Municipality. At the time of the 1991 Nepal census it had a population of 2,212 and had 405 houses in it.

References

External links
UN map of the municipalities of Kavrepalanchok District

Populated places in Kavrepalanchok District